Riingo Banerjee  is a noted Indian Bengali film director and score composer.

Riingo worked in the advertising industry for 14 years before entering the world of cinema working as a film writer, director, cinematographer and editor. He was the first person to introduce digital cinema in East India.

Awards
Anandalok Awards - Best director for Love (2008)

Filmography (As a director)
 Senapatis: Volume 2(2021)(Web Series on Addatimes)
 Karma(2020) (Addatimes Original Film)
 Checkmate(2020) (Addatimes Original Short Film)
 Senapatis: Volume 1(2019)(Web Series on Addatimes)
 Senapati (film) (2019)
 Dayamanti (2018)
 Ray (2018)
 Messi (2017)
 Luv Story TBA
 Road (2016)
 Ghuri (2014)
 Sada kalo abcha (2013)
 Na Hannyate (2012)
 System (2011)
 Ray (2010) (Television Release)
 Jodi Ekdin (2010)
 Risk (2009)
 Love (2008)
 Neel Rajar Deshe (2008)
 Kranti(2006) - As  director, editor, composer, cinematographer

References

1969 births
Living people
Film directors from Kolkata
Bengali film directors